Dinas Dinlle is a small settlement in Gwynedd, north-west Wales which is also, historically, part of Caernarfonshire.

Description
Dinas Dinlle has a large sand and pebble beach with vast areas of sand from mid-tide level. The foreshore consists of natural pebble banks. The popular beach offers views towards the Llŷn Peninsula (Penrhyn Llŷn) and towards Ynys Llanddwyn (Llanddwyn Island) on Anglesey. The area is a designated Site of Special Scientific Interest (SSSI). According to the 2011 Census, 77.9% of the population were Welsh speakers.

A small airport, Caernarfon Airport, is nearby. During the Second World War this was an RAF base but now it is mainly used for flying lessons and pleasure flights. A caravan park is located nearby.

The erosion by the sea is a substantial problem. A groyne built in 1994 to alleviate the problem was thought to be a mistake that had made the situation worse by 2013. The height of the groyne was to be reduced and the large boulders removed. This was important to preserve the beach and the Wales Coast Path.

Hillfort
The cliff above the beach is known as Boncan Dinas and is occupied by an Iron Age hillfort, Dinas Dinlle. This fort has been eroded by the sea, such that only a double semi-circular rampart remains. Finds of Roman pottery suggest reoccupation in the 2nd or 3rd centuries CE. The fort is about 164 yards from north to south by 120 yards with an entrance on the south west. It is possible that a Roman lighthouse originally stood here. It is possible to make out small depressions which are thought to indicate the sites of Iron Age huts and the mound may be the remains of a barrow.

Archaeological excavations at Dinas Dinlle in 2019 found the remains of structures inside the hillfort. These included 13m-diameter stone-built roundhouse with walls over 2m thick, thought to be one of the largest ever found in Wales. The excavations also found Roman coins and pottery dating from around 200CE to 300CE. The archaeological work was undertaken by the Gwynedd Archaeological Trust and the RCAHMW with funding from the EU 'CHERISH' project.

Gallery

See also
 List of hillforts in Wales

References

External links

 www.mudandroutes.com : A walk to the hillfort and images

Archaeological sites in Gwynedd
Hillforts in Gwynedd
Iron Age sites in Wales
Llandwrog
Sites of Special Scientific Interest in West Gwynedd
Villages in Gwynedd